The Coronet Theatre, formerly The Print Room, is an Off West End theatre located in the former Coronet Cinema in London. The building originated as a theatre in 1898; the modern company was founded in Westbourne Grove, West London, and opened in September 2010. It produces a programme of theatre, art, dance, poetry, film and music. The theatre is run by Artistic Director Anda Winters.

The Coronet Theatre currently operates using the 195-seat main auditorium, and a smaller, 100-seat black box theatre and studio space called The Print Room.

The Coronet Theatre stages lesser-known work by classic authors such as T.S Eliot, Arthur Miller and Harold Pinter, and new works by contemporary dramatists such as Brian Friel and Will Eno.

History

Building origins
The Coronet Theatre was designed as a theatre by leading architect W. G. R. Sprague at a cost of £25,000 and opened in 1898.  It was described in The Era as a "theatre of which the whole country may be proud". Famous actors who appeared at the theatre in its early days included Ellen Terry and Sarah Bernhardt.  It suffered, however, from being outside the traditional London theatrical district of the West End, whilst being sufficiently close to that district (unlike other provincial theatres) to find itself in competition with it.

Switch to cinema
In 1916, films were shown at the theatre for the first time, as part of variety programmes mixing live and filmed performances.

In 1923, it became a cinema full-time, and capacity was reduced from 1,143 to 1,010 seats, but it retained, as it still does, its original theatre interior, consisting of stalls and two upper tiers (a dress circle and a gallery).  However, the boxes on each side of the auditorium, next to the stage, were removed in 1931.  The stage was blocked off, and the cinema screen is placed within the proscenium arch.  The projection equipment was housed in the former dress circle bar.

In 1931, the cinema became part of Gaumont British, and it was at this time that the theatre boxes were removed.  In 1950, it was renamed the Gaumont and the upper tier was closed for seating, and capacity was therefore reduced to 196 in the dress circle and 319 in the stalls, a total of 515.

In 1972, the Rank Organisation (which had taken over Gaumont) proposed to demolish the building, but a local campaign based upon its architectural merit and its interesting history secured its survival and, indeed, refurbishment. In 1977 it was sold by Rank to an independent cinema operator, and its name reverted to the Coronet.  The new owners replaced the seating in the stalls so as to provide more legroom, reducing the total cinema capacity to 399 seats.

In 1989, the building was again under threat, but it was protected by a Grade II listing and the threat passed.  In 1996, a second screen with seating for 151 was opened in the stage area.

In 2004, the Coronet was acquired by the Kensington Temple, a large local Pentecostal church congregation.  However, it continued to offer mainstream independent cinema programming, without any censorship or Christian slant.  It was, for example, the cinema at which David Cameron was reported in the press to have watched Brokeback Mountain on its opening night.

In June 2014, it was announced that the Coronet had been acquired by nearby fringe theatre The Print Room, which planned to make it its new home.

Print Room original premises
The theatre began in a converted 1950s warehouse which had served as a graphic design workshop in Westbourne Grove. The venue had two spaces: an 80-seater studio, which was used for its larger productions, and a 40-seater space for smaller theatre pieces, play readings, and art exhibitions.

Print Room moves to new premises
In July 2014, it was announced that The Print Room was taking over the Coronet Cinema in Notting Hill Gate as its new home. In May 2019, Print Room at the Coronet re-branded the company to the original 1898 name The Coronet Theatre.

Productions 
 Fabrication by Pier Paolo Pasolini (10 November – 4 December 2010)
 Snake in the Grass by Alan Ayckbourn (9 February – 12 March 2011)
 Kingdom of Earth by Tennessee Williams (28 April – 28 May 2011)
 "Devils Festival" a two-week festival featuring work from the theatre's artistic apprentices: The Printer's Devils (18 June – 2 July 2011)
 One for the Road/Victoria Station by Harold Pinter (13 September – 1 October 2011)
 Judgement Day by Mike Poulton, a new version of Henrik Ibsen's When We Dead Awaken (16 November – 17 December 2011)
 The Brodsky Quartet: Petit Fours (28 February 2012)
 Toujours Et Pres de Moi, a Print Room/Opera Erratica co-production (14–26 May 2012)
 Uncle Vanya by Anton Chekhov in a new version by Mike Poulton (21 March – 28 April, and extended 18 June – 7 July 2012)
 Thom Pain (Based on Nothing) by Will Eno (15 September – 12 January 2008)
 Lot and His God by Howard Barker (3–24 November 2012)
 Ivy and Joan by James Hogan (14 January – 26 November 2013)
 Molly Sweeney by Brian Friel (27 April – 27 March 2013)
 Screaming in Advance – a two-day festival, comprising four new plays in rehearsed readings performed by members of the company, and Howard Barker in discussion with the company and the journalist Mark Brown.
 4000 Miles by Amy Herzog (14 May – 1 June 2013)
 Tutto Bene, Mamma? by Gloria Mina in a new English version by April de Angelis (15 June  – 6 July 2013)
 The Summer Concerts, featuring Antonio Forcione and Adriano Adewale Duo, Death's Cabaret: A Love Story and L'Homme Orchestre: Jean Michel Bernard (30 June – 11 July 2013)
 The Last Yankee by Arthur Miller (7 September – 5 October 2013)
 The Dumb Waiter by Harold Pinter (27 October – 23 November 2013)
 Amygdala by Geraldine Alexander (25 November – 14 December 2013)
 The Cocktail Party by T.S. Eliot (14 September – 10 October 2015)
 Ubu and the Truth Commission directed by William Kentridge in collaboration with Handspring Puppet Company (15 October 2015 – 7 November 2015)
 Trois Ruptures/Three Splits by Remi De Vos (11 November 2015 – 18 November 2015)
 Table of Delights by Theatre Damfino (23 November 2015 – 13 December 2015)
 Five Finger Exercise by Peter Shaffer (18 January – 13 February 2016)
 Terra, written by Hubert Essakow and performed by the Print Room Dance Company (23 February – 12 March 2016)
 Deathwatch by Jean Genet and translated by David Rudkin (11 April – 7 May 2016)
 In the Depths of Love by Howard Barker (15 January – 7 February 2017)
 Trouble in Mind by Alice Childress (14 September – 14 October)

Awards & nominations 
 Peter Brook Empty Space Award Nominee 2011
 Off West End Award for Best Set Designer 2012, for Kingdom of Earth, won by Ruth Sutcliffe
 Off West End Award for Best Sound Designer 2012, for Snake in The Grass, won by Neil Alexander
 Off West End Award for Best Production 2013, for Uncle Vanya

In popular culture
The Coronet featured in the 1999 film Notting Hill, as the cinema where a sad Will Thacker (Hugh Grant) watches a film with his big love Anna Scott (Julia Roberts) after they have separated. Also, it is the home of the character Matt Hatter in the animated series Matt Hatter Chronicles.

References

Bibliography
 Barbara Denny, Notting Hill and Holland Park Past, Historical Publications, 1993,

External links 
 
 
 arthurlloyd.co.uk: History of the Coronet Theatre

Theatres in the Royal Borough of Kensington and Chelsea
Theatres completed in 1898
Buildings and structures in Notting Hill
Grade II listed buildings in the Royal Borough of Kensington and Chelsea
Grade II listed theatres
Former cinemas in London
History of the Royal Borough of Kensington and Chelsea